Katzenjammer Kabarett is a French four-piece dark cabaret band from Paris, France. Aesthetically inspired by German Weimar-era cabarets and burlesque shows, the band also chose a name of German origin that literally translates to "cat's wail cabaret" with Katzenjammer also generally meaning "discordant sound" and being used as a synonym for a hangover. Other stylistic influences range from Dadaism, Futurism and Symbolism to Postmodernism.

History
The band was founded in 2004 by vocalist Mary Komplikated, guitarist Herr Katz, keyboardist Klischee and bass player Mr. Guillotine. In 2005 they released a self-titled EP which was freely distributed on their website. It was followed by their likewise self-titled debut album in 2006.

Hence the band received critical acclaim and performed on several festivals, including the Wave-Gotik-Treffen 2006 in Leipzig, the Amphi Festival 2007 in Cologne and the Summer Darkness festival 2009 in Utrecht. They also performed as a supporting act for the American dark cabaret band The Dresden Dolls, to whom they are often compared. In January 2009, they released their second studio album, Grand Guignol & Variétés on America's Projekt Records.

The band split up in 2009. Klischee and Mr Guillotine formed in 2011 a new band called Katzkab.

Style
The band's musical style is a mixture of different genres including post-punk, deathrock, electropunk, gothic rock, new wave music, electronic music, classical music and German "Lieder" (Romantic-era art songs). Referring to themselves as "death rock cabaret", "multireferential post-punk" and "baroque krautpop", the band also cites early New and Dark Wave bands like Bauhaus, Christian Death and Siouxsie and the Banshees as influences.

Discography

Studio albums
 Katzenjammer Kabarett (2006)
 Grand Guignol & Variétés (2009)
 Object No. 1 (2013)

EPs
 Katzenjammer Kabarett (2005)

Compilations
 "Gemini Girly Song" on New Dark Age Vol. 2 (2004)
 "Eve at the Mansion" on Pagan Love Songs (2004)
 "Lie Sucks Not" on Gothic compilation No. 29 (2005)
 "Gemini Girly Song" on A Dark Cabaret (2005)

References

External links
 Official website
 Official MySpace Page

Musical groups from Paris
Dark cabaret musicians
Death rock groups
Projekt Records artists
Musical groups established in 2004